The Railways of Guyana comprised two public railways, the Demerara-Berbice Railway and the Demerara-Essequibo railway. There are also several industrial railways mainly for the bauxite industry. The Demerara-Berbice Railway is the oldest in South America. None of the railways are in operation in the 21st century.

Demerara-Berbice railway

The Demerara-Berbice Railway, built in then British Guiana (now Guyana), was the first railway system on the South American continent. It was 4 ft 8½ ins (1,435 mm) standard gauge and first operated by the Demerara Railway Company, a private concern, but sold to the Colonial Transport Department of the Government, which assumed control from 1 January 1922.

Route

The railway ran for  along the coast from the capital and main port Georgetown in Demerara to Rosignol in Berbice, whence it was connected by ferry steamer across the Berbice River to New Amsterdam.

History

The bill proposing the construction of the railway was passed in July 1846. The railway was designed, surveyed and built by the British-American architect and artist Frederick Catherwood. All the railway stations, bridges, stores and other facilities were constructed by John Bradshaw Sharples. Financing was provided by the Demerera Sugar Company who wished to transport their product to the dock of Georgetown. Construction was in sections with the first, from Georgetown to Plaisance, opening on 3 November 1848. The opening day's festivities featured the death of one of the railway's directors by being run over by the locomotive.

An extension to Belfield was completed in 1854, to Mahaica in 1864 and finally to Rosignol during 1897–1900.

In 1948 the railway system in Bermuda was dismantled and sold 'lock, stock & barrel' to the government of British Guiana (as the country then was) to rejuvenate the former system. The locomotives (petrol or diesel [just 2]) and coaches were fully restored, the latter being painted dark green. In 1953 the public lines in the colony carried 1,772,954 passengers and 92,769 tonnes of freight. A bold plan to extend the railway south to Brazil was never proceeded with.

The public railway system was dismantled in stages by then President Forbes Burnham, and closed in 1972.

The Lamaha Street terminus of the Demerara-Berbice Railway was converted into a bus terminal subsequent to the closing of the railway.

Service

Following the opening in 1848, there were two return trains per day between Georgetown and Plaisance.

In 1922 there was one train each week day, departing Georgetown at 08:00 and returning in the evening.

The Georgetown-Rosignol railway service ended in 1972.

Infrastructure

There were three major bridges on the line, all constructed of steel, across the Mahaica, Mahaicony and Abary Rivers.

There were seventeen stations on the Demerara-Berbice Railway:

 Georgetown
 Bel Air
 Plaisance
 Beterverwagting
 Buxton
 Nonpareil
 Enmore
 Golden Grove
 Belfield
 Clonbrook
 Mahaica
 de Kinderen
 Mahaicony
 Belladrum
 Lichfield
 Fort Wellington
 Rosignol

Rolling stock

In 1936, the Colonial Transport Department owned 16 locomotives, 39 coaches and 283 goods wagons.

Locomotives

Demerara-Essequibo railway

Route

Guyana's second railway, the Demerara-Essequibo Railway, was 3ft 6ins (1067mm) gauge and ran for  along the West Coast of Demerara from Vreed en Hoop on the left bank of the Demerara River to Parika on the Essequibo River.

History

Its first section was laid from Vreed-en-Hoop to Greenwich Park c1899 and it was extended to Parika in 1914.

The Demerara-Essequibo railway service ended in 1974.

Service

In 1922 there were three return trains each day, timed to interconnect with arriving and departing steam ferries.

Infrastructure

By 1974 there were eight railway stations along the Demerara-Essequibo line: 
 Vreed-en-Hoop
 Windsor Forest
 Hague
 Leonora
 Uitvlugt
 de Kinderen
 Tuschen
 Vergenoegen 
 Greenwich Park
 Parika

A number of minor stops, called platforms, were located between the stations, e.g., at Crane, 
Blankenberg,
Den Amstel, 
Cornelia Ida,
Stewartville, 
De Willem,
Farm.

There was one railway bridge of steel construction across the Boeraserie River.

Industrial railways

The industrial railway systems continued to operate following the closure of the public system and included several at bauxite mining sites and another linking Port Kaituma and Matthew's Ridge in the Northwest District.

The Essequibo River was hard to navigate, but the Demerara River was suitable for ocean-going ships. The railway line gave access to the gold fields, balatá and hardwood plantations. In 1936, the company owned 14 locomotives and 272 goods wagons. The railway was closed in the 1940s.

Bibliography

 The British Guiana Government Railways, article Railway Magazine January 1964
The Old Railway Station, Lamaha Street, Cummingsburg, National Trust of Guyana.
 UK Directorate of Overseas Surveys 1:500,000 map of Guyana NE sheet, 1972.
 History of the British Guiana Railway System – Georgetown to Mahaica, Part 1, Shammane Joseph, Stabroek News, 2008-12-25.
 History of the British Guiana Railway System – Georgetown to Mahaica, Part 2, Shammane Joseph, Stabroek News, 2009-02-12.
 History of the British Guiana Railway System – Georgetown to Mahaica, Part 4, Stabroek News, 2009-07-09.
 History of the British Guiana Railway System – Georgetown to Mahaica, Part 5, Shammane Joseph, Stabroek News, 2009-11-07.

See also

 Transport in Guyana

References

 
Rail infrastructure in Guyana
History of Guyana